The 2017 LSU Tigers baseball team represents Louisiana State University (LSU) during the 2017 NCAA Division I baseball season. The Tigers play their home games at Alex Box Stadium as a member of the Southeastern Conference. They are led by head coach Paul Mainieri, in his 11th season at LSU. The Tigers would host both the Baton Rouge Regional and Super Regional, before advancing to the 2017 College World Series. The Tigers would eventually lose to Florida in the series.

Previous season
In 2016, the Tigers finished the season 3rd in the SEC's Western Division with a record of 45–21–0, 19–11–0 in conference play. They qualified for the 2016 Southeastern Conference baseball tournament and fell to Florida in the semifinal, 1–0. They qualified for the 2016 NCAA Division I baseball tournament as an At–large bid, and were selected as the #8 overall national seed. The Tigers were selected as hosts of the Baton Rouge regional, which included Rice, Southeastern Louisiana, and Utah Valley. The Tigers won their first two games of the regional, defeating Utah Valley, 7–1, and Rice, 4–2. In the regional final, LSU was again matched up with Rice. In the first game of the regional final, the Owls defeated the Tigers, 10–6. The Tigers went on to win game two, 5–2, eliminating Rice and advancing to the Baton Rouge Super Regional, where they faced the Coastal Carolina. In game one of the Super Regionals, the Tigers fell 11–8. In Game 2, Coastal Carolina hit a walk-off hit to upset the Fighting Tigers 4–3, moving onto the 2016 College World Series, where the Chanticleers would go on to win the National Championship.

Personnel

Roster

Coaching staff

Schedule

All rankings from Collegiate Baseball.

Record vs. conference opponents

Rankings

Awards and honors
 OF Greg Deichmann: consensus All-America, first-team All-SEC
 SP Alex Lange: first-team All-SEC
 SS Kramer Robertson: second-team All-SEC
 3B Josh Smith: freshman All-SEC, All-SEC defensive
 OF Zach Watson: freshman All-SEC
 SP Eric Walker: freshman All-SEC
 C Michael Papierski: All-SEC defensive

References

LSU Tigers
LSU Tigers baseball seasons
LSU Tigers baseball
LSU
College World Series seasons
Southeastern Conference baseball champion seasons